Daniel Brückner (born 14 February 1981) is a German footballer who plays as a midfielder for Niendorfer TSV.

International career
Although born in Germany, Brückner's father is Algerian and the player has indicated that he has received Algerian citizenship and is interested in representing the country in international competition.

References

External links

1981 births
Living people
Sportspeople from Rostock
Association football midfielders
Algerian footballers
German footballers
German people of Algerian descent
SpVgg Greuther Fürth players
FC Rot-Weiß Erfurt players
SC Paderborn 07 players
SV Werder Bremen II players
2. Bundesliga players
3. Liga players
Bundesliga players
Footballers from Mecklenburg-Western Pomerania
HEBC Hamburg players